Hesychopa molybdica is a moth of the subfamily Arctiinae. It was described by Turner in 1940. It is found in Australia, where it has been recorded from Queensland.

References

Moths described in 1940
Lithosiini
Moths of Australia